Vincenzo Chialli (27 July 1787 – 24 September 1840) was an Italian painter.

Biography
Chialli was born at Città di Castello.  After having learned the rudiments of art in that town, he visited Rome at the age of seventeen years, and became a disciple of Camuccini, whom he afterwards imitated. His brother, Giuseppe, (1800-1839), became a sculptor. After leaving Rome Vincenzo painted religious subjects at Borgo San Sepolcro, Urbino, Pesaro, and Venice, from whence he retraced his steps to Rome; but as the climate did not suit him, he left that city in 1822 and returned to Citta di Castello. He became Director of the School of Painting at Cortona in 1835, and died in 1840. Among his pupils were Angiolo Tricca. His genre and historical paintings gained him considerable credit. The most important are:

The Churchyard and The Mass, both in the Pitti Palace at Florence.
Dante in the Abbey of Fonte Avellana. Private Collection Italy
Raphael and Fra Bartolommeo in the Convent of San Marco.
The young Raphael with his Parents.

References

Attribution:
 

1787 births
1840 deaths
People from Città di Castello
18th-century Italian painters
Italian male painters
19th-century Italian painters
Umbrian painters
19th-century Italian male artists
18th-century Italian male artists